Karl Alexander "Sander" Adelaar (born 1953 in The Hague) is a Dutch linguist. He is primarily interested in the Austronesian languages of Borneo, Madagascar, and Taiwan, as well as the Malayic languages. He also does research on the oral and literary traditions of Indonesia.

Adelaar is currently based at the University of Melbourne. He is the current managing editor of Pacific Linguistics.

Education
Adelaar is a graduate of Indonesian Studies at Leiden University. In 1977, he defended his MA thesis, and in 1985 he obtained a doctorate in Austronesian linguistics.

References

Living people
1953 births
Linguists of Austronesian languages
Linguists from the Netherlands
Leiden University alumni
Scientists from The Hague
Academic staff of the University of Melbourne